Purple Pirate is a fantasy novel by author Talbot Mundy. It was first published in 1935 by Appleton-Century. Parts of the story appeared in the magazine Adventure.

Plot introduction
The novel concerns the further adventures of Tros of Samathrace who battles intrigue in Cleopatra's court while he woos her sister.

Reception
Galaxy reviewer Floyd C. Gale gave the novel five stars out of five. He noted that the novel avoided the decline in quality he expected in sequels, matching the prior volume in "plot audacity, skill of execution and characterization."

Publication history
1935, US, Appleton-Century, Pub date 1935, Hardback
1935, UK, Hutchinson, Pub date 1935, Hardback
1959, US, Gnome Press, hardcover
1970, US, Avon Books, paperback
1977, US, Zebra Books, paperback
2008, UK, Leonaur Books, paperback

References

1935 American novels
American fantasy novels
Appleton-Century books